PMNH may refer to:

 Pakistan Museum of Natural History, Islamabad, Pakistan
 Peabody Museum of Natural History, Yale University, Connecticut, USA